Corris Uchaf is a village lying in the south of the Snowdonia National Park in Gwynedd, Wales. 
The slate quarries that surround Corris Uchaf are its most prominent feature.

Description 
The village lies in the valley of the Afon Deri, and is threaded by the A487 road, a trunk road between Dolgellau and Machynlleth. The Afon Deri runs into the Afon Dulas

The quarries around the village are Abercwmeiddaw and Abercorris, Gaewern and Braichgoch. The quarry operations were owned by the Lloyd Family and Wincilate Welsh Slate/Inigo Jones were and are still run by John Lloyd.

The narrow-gauge horse-drawn Upper Corris Tramway was part of the infrastructure which carried slate from the quarries to Machynlleth.

Corris Uchaf has a garden of Italian Follies or Folly built by Mark & Muriel Bourne, A trust was recently set up to care for the site.

The village also contains a local authority homeless and probation hostel in the large building known as Rhianfa.

Corris Uchaf is also part of what is known as "The Mach Loop", a low fly zone for military aircraft with the military prefix reference LFA7.

In the 2010s, approximately 100 abandoned cars were discovered in the Cavern of Lost Souls.

Government 
The village has a community council. The current representatives are Marit Olsson, Sharon Wells and the local councillor who often attends is John Pughe Roberts. The community council system replaced the old parish council system and tackles local issues, acts as a contact point between local government and residents for information and resource on many environmental, equality, ethnicity and gender issues and other problems.

Notable residents 
 Writer Geraint Goodwin lived in the village in 1938 and 1939.
 Classical composer Otto Freudenthal in 2006–2017.

References

External links

 Community council
 Eco Dyfi Valley Partnership
 Corris Craft Centre
 King Arthur's Labyrinth
 www.geograph.co.uk : photos of Corris Uchaf and surrounding area
 Corris Institute
 : winslate welsh slate
 : Death A489 Corris Uchaf
 hostel Corris Uchaf
 Inigo Jones

Villages in Gwynedd
Corris
Corris Railway